Cistus albidus, the grey-leaved cistus, is a shrubby species of flowering plant in the family Cistaceae, with pink to purple flowers, native to south-western Europe and western north Africa.

Description
They have three prominent veins and are densely covered with short hairs, producing a greyish-white appearance.

Taxonomy and phylogeny 
Cistus albidus was first described by Carl Linnaeus in 1753 in Species Plantarum (p. 524). The specific epithet albidus means "whitish", referring to the leaves and shoots.

A 2011 molecular phylogenetic study placed C. albidus as the sister to Cistus creticus in the purple and pink flowered clade (PPC) of Cistus species. C. creticus is found largely in the eastern Mediterranean, and the distributions of the two species show little overlap. They are able to hybridize, producing the fertile hybrid C. × canescens.

The sister group to both species is C. heterophyllus.

Distribution
Cistus albidus is native to the west of Southern Europe and western North Africa, particularly around the Mediterranean, including Portugal, Spain, the Balearic Islands, France, Corsica, Italy, Sardinia, and Morocco.

References

External links
 
 

albidus
Plants described in 1753
Taxa named by Carl Linnaeus